Talaromyces atroroseus is a species of fungus described as new to science in 2013. Found in soil and fruit, it was first identified from house dust collected in South Africa. The fungus produces a stable red pigment with no known toxins that, it is speculated, could be used in manufacturing, especially mass-produced foods.

References

Trichocomaceae
Fungi described in 2013
Fungi of Africa